Fundis most often refers to:
 Fundi (politics) - fundis - plural form of short term for "fundamentalists" in some political circles.
 Fungal Diversity Survey, a 501(c)3 non-profit also known as FunDiS, formerly North American Mycoflora Project.